Pepijn Schlösser (born 14 February 1998) is a Dutch professional footballer who plays for German club Alemannia Aachen.

Club career
He made his Eerste Divisie debut for Roda JC Kerkrade on 5 October 2018 in a game against Jong PSV as a 78th-minute substitute for Henk Dijkhuizen.

In August 2021 he joined German side KFC Uerdingen 05.

References

External links
 
 

1998 births
Footballers from Limburg (Netherlands)
Sportspeople from Heerlen
Living people
Dutch footballers
Association football defenders
Roda JC Kerkrade players
KFC Uerdingen 05 players
Alemannia Aachen players
Eerste Divisie players
Regionalliga players
Expatriate footballers in Germany
Dutch expatriate footballers
Dutch expatriate sportspeople in Germany